Australian Signals Directorate (ASD), formerly the Defence Signals Directorate (DSD) is the federal statutory agency in the Australian Government responsible for foreign signals intelligence, support to military operations, cyber warfare, and information security. ASD is part of the Australian Intelligence Community. ASD's role within UKUSA Agreement (Five Eyes) is to monitor signals intelligence ("SIGINT") in South and East Asia. The ASD also houses the Australian Cyber Security Centre.

The unit was established in 1947 by executive order as the Defence Signals Bureau within the Department of Defence, and underwent several name changes until its current name ASD was adopted in 2013. ASD was converted to a statutory body by the Intelligence Services Act 2001. ASD is based in Canberra, at the Defence Department Headquarters at Russell Offices. As of February 2020, Rachel Noble is the Director-General of ASD, replacing Mike Burgess, who was appointed Director-General of Security in September 2019.

In April 2018, a proposal to empower ASD to collect intelligence on Australians was backed by former Minister for Home Affairs Peter Dutton, but is strongly opposed by some in Cabinet who argue it is not necessary. Under legislation, the Australian Security Intelligence Organisation (ASIO) and the Australian Federal Police (AFP) are already allowed to seek assistance from ASD in conducting investigations on Australian citizens and businesses.

History
The Directorate has operated under a number of different names since its founding:

 1947 – Defence Signals Bureau established within the Department of Defence
 1949 – name changed to Defence Signals Branch
 1964 – name changed to Defence Signals Division
 1977 – name changed to Defence Signals Directorate on recommendation of the Royal Commission on Intelligence and Security (Hope Commission) 
 2013 – name changed to Australian Signals Directorate

ASD commissioned an official history in 2019, which will cover the organisation's history from its establishment to 2001.

Roles and responsibilities
The principal functions of ASD are to collect and disseminate foreign signals intelligence (SIGINT) and to provide information security products and services to the Australian Government and Australian Defence Force (ADF), its foreign partners and militaries.

ASD operates at least three receiving stations: 
 the Australian Defence Satellite Communications Station (ADSCS), located at Kojarena, near Geraldton, Western Australia,
 the Shoal Bay Receiving Station, located at Shoal Bay, Northern Territory, and 
 a small station on the Cocos (Keeling) Islands.

ASD also maintains a workforce at Pine Gap in central Australia.

ADSCS and Shoal Bay are part of the United States signals intelligence and ECHELON analysis network. These stations also contribute signals intelligence for many Australian Government bodies, as well as the other UKUSA partners.

Electronic warfare operators in the Royal Australian Corps of Signals work closely with ASD. 7 Signal Regiment (Electronic Warfare) at Borneo Barracks, Queensland is also associated with ASD..

In addition, it has been reported that many Australian embassies and overseas missions also house small facilities which provide a flow of signals intelligence to ASD.

UKUSA Agreement (Five Eyes)
Australia joined the UKUSA Agreement in 1948, a multilateral agreement for cooperation in signals intelligence between Australia, Canada, New Zealand, the United Kingdom, and the United States. The alliance is also known as the Five Eyes. Other countries, known as "third parties", such as West Germany, the Philippines, and several Nordic countries also joined the UKUSA community. As the Agreement was a secret treaty, its existence was not even disclosed to the Australian Prime Minister until 1973, when Gough Whitlam insisted on seeing it. The existence of the UKUSA Agreement was discovered by the Australian government during the 1973 Murphy raids on the headquarters of the Australian Security Intelligence Organisation (ASIO). After learning about the agreement, Whitlam discovered that Pine Gap, a secret surveillance station close to Alice Springs, Australia, had been operated by the U.S. Central Intelligence Agency (CIA). Pine Gap is now operated jointly by both Australia and the United States.

The existence of the Agreement was not disclosed to the public until 2005. On 25 June 2010, for the first time, the full text of the agreement was publicly released by the United Kingdom and the United States, and can now be viewed online. Under the agreement, ASD's intelligence is shared with UKUSA signals intelligence partner agencies: 
 the National Security Agency (NSA)United States, 
 the Government Communications Headquarters (GCHQ)United Kingdom, 
 the Communications Security Establishment (CSE)Canada, and 
 the Government Communications Security Bureau (GCSB)New Zealand.

Organisational structure
The Australian Signals Directorate is led by a Director-General and a Principal Deputy Director-General who oversee strategy. The ASD also comprises the Australian Cyber Security Centre, a Signals Intelligence and Network Operations Group, and a Corporate and Capability Group.

SIGINT and Network Operations Group
The Signals Intelligence and Network Operations Group is responsible for signals intelligence collection, analysis and production, and ASD's network based access and effects operations. The Group comprises an Intelligence Division and a Network Operations and Access Division responsible for foreign signals intelligence and offensive cyber operations.

Defence SIGINT and Cyber Command
The Defence Signals-Intelligence (SIGINT) and Cyber Command (DSCC) was established in January 2018 by the Chief of the Defence Force consolidating all ADF personnel within the ASD within the Joint Cyber Unit and Joint SIGINT Unit. The Commander of the DSCC is responsible to the Head of Information Warfare under the Chief of Joint Capabilities to the Chief of the Defence Force. The Commander is currently Commodore James McCormack of the Royal Australian Navy who was previously the Director-General for Support to Military Operations within the Australian Signals Directorate.

Leadership

Director

Principal Deputy Director

See also

 Australian Intelligence Community
 Defence Signal Intelligence and Cyber Command
List of intelligence agencies
 Espionage
 ECHELON

References

External links
 Australian Signals Directorate official website
 Open Australia Search: Parliamentary records mentioning 'signals directorate'.

Cryptography organizations
Signals intelligence agencies
Australian intelligence agencies
Commonwealth Government agencies of Australia
1947 establishments in Australia
Government agencies established in 1947
Cold War history of Australia
Defence Strategic Policy and Intelligence Group
Organisations based in Canberra